Rebel Scum is a Star Wars fan film directed by Timothy Van Nguyen. On January 9, 2016, the film was released to YouTube. It takes place shortly after the Rebels retreat from Echo Base on the planet Hoth during the beginning of The Empire Strikes Back. As of February 2023, it has been viewed over 2.3 million times.

Cast
 Andrae Braun as Rebel Pilot
 Anastasia Moody as Imperial Snowtrooper
 Hanna Soltek as Pilot's Wife
 Samantha Roberts as Pilot's Daughter

Production
Around January 2015 to around March 2015, filming took place in Alberta, Canada. A snow camera was used during filming.

Instead of using CGI, stop motion animation and practical effects were used, due to the budget, and to make something that felt "real and lifelike". To film the animation, they used an illuminated box with still pictures of the scenes.

Release
The film was officially selected at the 2016 Tri-Cities International Film Festival, MidAmeriCon II, the 2016 Lost Episode Festival Toronto, and the 2017 WorldFest-Houston International Film Festival.

Reception
Richard Lawson of Vanity Fair praised the visual effects, described the film as, "well-produced," and said, "It’s a good, humbly done micro movie. I like it." Nick Statt of The Verge praised the costume work, how the environment was used, and the visual effects. Jeff Spry of Syfy Wire ranked the film number seven on his top fourteen best Star Wars fan films list. He described it as "excellent," and "impressive." Brock Wilbur of Inverse described himself as "blown away" after viewing the film. Holly Williams of ContactMusic.com called the film, "[The] Best Star Wars tribute ever...," and praised the filmmakers' efforts and production quality. Julien Cadot of Numerama called it (translated into English), "9 minutes you will not regret!," and praised the story. Jeremy Fuster of TheWrap ranked the film number two on his top eleven best Star Wars fan films list. Chloe Cole of Dorkly described the film as something that could have been in the Original Trilogy of Star Wars. Steve Fitch of Star Wars Reporter called the film, "engaging," and, "brilliant."

Accolades

References

External links
 
 

2016 films
Fan films based on Star Wars
2010s English-language films
2010s American films
Films released on YouTube